Raimondo Ferretti (1650–1719) was a Roman Catholic prelate who served as Archbishop of Ravenna (1692–1719) and Bishop of Recanati e Loreto (1690–1692).

Biography
Raimondo Ferretti was born in Ancona, Italy in 1650 and ordained a priest on 10 March 1674. On 10 July 1690, he was appointed during the papacy of Pope Alexander VIII as Bishop of Recanati e Loreto. On 6 August 1690, he was consecrated bishop by Paluzzo Paluzzi Altieri Degli Albertoni, Cardinal-Bishop of Sabina, with Prospero Bottini, Titular Archbishop of Myra, and Nicolò d'Arcano, Bishop of Comacchio, serving as co-consecrators. On 9 January 1692, he was appointed during the papacy of Pope Innocent XII as Archbishop of Ravenna. He served as Archbishop of Ravenna until his death on 24 March 1719.

References

External links and additional sources
 (for Chronology of Bishops) 
 (for Chronology of Bishops) 
 (for Chronology of Bishops) 
 (for Chronology of Bishops) 

17th-century Italian Roman Catholic archbishops
18th-century Italian Roman Catholic archbishops
Bishops appointed by Pope Alexander VIII
Bishops appointed by Pope Innocent XII
1650 births
1719 deaths